Sanders Coaches is a bus operator based in Holt, Norfolk, England. It is operated by Charles Sanders. As of September 2021, it has approximately 115 employees.

History 
Sanders Coaches was founded on 1 December 1975 by Norman J Sanders, following the retirement of Sanders' employer George Bennett. Sanders took over six vehicles from Bennett's Coaches.

In 2019, Sanders closed its Fakenham depot, merging its operations with its depot in Holt.

In May 2020, Sanders Coaches was given permission to expand its depot in Holt.

In May 2021, the firm purchased a new Plaxton Panther coach. In 2022, the firm increased its fleet of Volvo B8RLE buses to ten.

Routes
Sanders operates the majority of bus services in North Norfolk.

When Stagecoach in Norfolk ceased operations in April 2018, Sanders took over the eastern section of its Coasthopper route, between Wells-next-the-Sea and Cromer, which Sanders extended to North Walsham. At Wells, it connects with Lynx's Coastliner which goes to Hunstanton and King's Lynn. In 2021 and 2022, six new MCV Evora-bodied Volvo B8RLEs were bought for the service.

In 2021, the firm introduced the number 8 Holt Hopper service, a local service operating within Holt, funded by section 106 contributions from local housing estates.

References

Bus operators in Norfolk
Holt, Norfolk